Brian Jones (born 12 September 1951) is an Australian professional golfer.

Golf career 
Jones was born in Sydney. He turned professional in 1971. He played on the throughout Asia and Australasia including on the Japan Golf Tour. He won the Indian Open two times, five times in Australasia, and twelve times in Japan. He won 11 events on the Japan Golf Tour between 1977 and 1993.

Jones played in multiple Open Championships; his best performance coming at the 1981 Open Championship, where he finished in a tie for 8th place.

Jones played on the European Seniors Tour from 2002 to 2005, winning the 2002 De Vere Hotels Seniors Classic.

Personal life 
Jones married Sachiko, a Japanese woman, in the early 1980s.

Professional wins (21)

Japan Golf Tour wins (11)

*Note: The 1986 Bridgestone Aso Open was shortened to 63 holes due to rain.

Japan Golf Tour playoff record (3–4)

PGA Tour of Australasia wins (4)

PGA Tour of Australasia playoff record (1–2)

Asia Golf Circuit wins (3) 
1972 Indian Open
1977 Indian Open
1978 Malaysian Open

Other wins (2)
1970 Western Australia Open
1985 Acom Doubles (with Mike Ferguson) (Japan)

European Senior Tour wins (1)

Results in major championships

CUT = missed the half-way cut (3rd round cut in 1976, 1979 and 1982 Open Championships)
"T" indicates a tie for a place
Note: Jones only played in The Open Championship.

Team appearances
World Cup (representing Australia): 1990
Four Tours World Championship (representing Australasia): 1985, 1986, 1987, 1988, 1989, 1990 (winners)

See also
List of golfers with most Japan Golf Tour wins

References

External links

Australian male golfers
Japan Golf Tour golfers
European Senior Tour golfers
Golfers from Sydney
1951 births
Living people